The Fourth Estate: A Film of a British Newspaper is a 1940 documentary film directed by Paul Rotha. The film was sponsored by the owners of The Times, and depicts the preparation and production of a day's edition of the newspaper.

The film is notable for the fact that it went unreleased (apart from a small number of private screenings for the sponsor and critics).  The Second World War broke out while it was in production, and the explanation for The Fourth Estate having been buried most commonly given by historians of the Documentary Movement is that following the film's completion, the Ministry of Information were reluctant to sanction its release on the grounds that it depicted life in peacetime London, which would no longer be accepted by viewers as realistic.  However, Rotha himself claimed that the film's sponsor was reluctant to release The Fourth Estate in the belief that it implicitly criticised The Times from a leftist perspective, portraying it as the mouthpiece of the establishment.

Another point of interest is that Carl Mayer, the Jewish and prominent Weimar screenwriter, who by this time was living in Britain as an exile from the Nazis, acted as a 'scenario consultant' to the film.

In 2012, the first public screening of the full film was at the University of Leeds using film print from the archive of the British Film Institute (BFI).

References

External links
 The Fourth Estate at the British Film Institute's SIFT database.
 

1940 films
British documentary films
Sponsored films
Promotional films
British black-and-white films
Films directed by Paul Rotha
Documentary films about journalism
1940 documentary films
Black-and-white documentary films
Films with screenplays by Carl Mayer
Films shot at British National Studios
1940s English-language films
1940s British films